Inaugurated in 1880, the Matale line (sometimes referred to as the Kandy line) is a branch railway line in Sri Lanka.  Operated by Sri Lanka Railways, the line includes some of the busiest rail services in the country.

History
The  route was surveyed between 1875 and 1877. In May 1878 the contract to construct the rail line was issued to David Reid for Rs. 1,782,408. The total estimated cost of the Matale extension amounted to Rs. 3,300,000, being a rate of Rs. 189,247 per mile. The line was opened for traffic on 4 October 1880 by the Governor, Sir James Longden, eight months earlier than the contract date, for which Reid was given a Rs. 35,000 bonus.

Route definition
The Matale line begins at Peradeniya Junction and runs east towards  Kandy Railway Station.  It then turns north and runs through Katugastota and Wattegama before reaching the Matale District. It passes through  Ukuwela before terminating at the Matale Railway Station.

Infrastructure
The Matale line has a gauge of  broad gauge. The line is not electrified.  Regular services run on diesel power.

Timetable

Downwards

Upwards

References 

5 ft 6 in gauge railways in Sri Lanka
Rail transport in Central Province, Sri Lanka